Geraldo Sachipengo Nunda is a diplomat and former general. He is currently ambassador of the Republic of Angola to the United Kingdom of Great Britain and Northern Ireland (since 15 January 2020).

Biography 
He was born on 13 September 1952 in Nharaa, Bié. In 2002, he "graduated in Social Sciences of Education" and in 2009 gained a master's degree in the history of Angola from the Agostinho Neto University. Nunda was head of the Angolan Armed forces from 2010 until 2018, when he was charged over reports of corruption. These were later dropped due to an absence of evidence.

He is married to Caty Nunda.

References 

1952 births
Living people
Ambassadors of Angola to the United Kingdom
Angolan military personnel